Vincent Bolloré (born 1 April 1952) is a French billionaire businessman. He is the chairman and CEO of the investment group Bolloré. As of Jan 2023, his net worth is estimated at US$10.1 billion.

Early life
Bolloré was born in Boulogne-Billancourt. He attended the Lycée Janson-de-Sailly, before graduating with a business degree from Université Paris X Nanterre. Bolloré started his career as an investment bank trainee at Edmond de Rothschild.

Career

Bolloré's personal investment career began when he took over at his family-controlled conglomerate Bolloré, which deals in maritime freight and African trade, and paper manufacturing (cigarette and bible paper). Bolloré employs 33,000 people worldwide. He is a well-known corporate raider in France who has succeeded in making money by taking large stakes in French listed companies, in particular the building and construction group Bouygues, where he left with a sizeable capital gain after a power struggle. He pulled a similar move with French video game company Ubisoft, owning an approximate 27% stake in the company in 2016, before Ubisoft president Yves Guillemot maneuvered a deal to have a coalition of Tencent Games, among other companies, to buy out Bolloré's shares for about $2.45 billion.

In late 2004, his investment group started building a stake in advertising group Havas, becoming its largest single shareholder. He mounted a coup and replaced Alain de Pouzilhac as CEO in July 2005. In 2005, through his family company, he expanded his media interests by launching the Direct 8 television station. Towards the end of 2005, he began building a stake in independent British media planning and buying group, Aegis. As of July 2006, his stake in Aegis stood at 29%. , a free newspaper, was launched in June 2006. In January 2008, he manifested interest in becoming a shareholder of famed, but troubled, Italian car manufacturer Pininfarina.  In 2014, as Vivendi president he decided to invest in the Italian telecom company Telecom Italia and in the Italian broadcaster, Mediaset, controlled by Berlusconi family’s holding company Fininvest.

The Bolloré Group also has important positions in the economies of several former French colonies in Africa (in particular Ivory Coast, Gabon, Cameroon, and Congo).
On 24 April 2018, Bolloré was brought into custody for questioning concerning perceived links between discount rates for political consulting (through Havas) and port concessions in Lomé, Togo; and Conakry, Guinea. He was subsequently indicted for "corruption of foreign agents", "falsification of documents", and "complicity in breach of trust". If found guilty, he could face a maximum fine of €1 million and up to 10 years' imprisonment.

As a result of Universal Music Group IPO at Euronext Amsterdam, Bolloré now held 18 percent of UMG shares.

Personal life 
He has four children from his first union: Sébastien, Yannick, Cyrille, and Marie, and adopted one child during his current union. He is married to Anaïs Jeanneret, a French writer.

He is ranked 499th-richest person in the world, according to Bloomberg, with an estimated fortune of US$5.27 billion.

He is a close personal friend of former French President Nicolas Sarkozy. It has been said that their friendship goes back over 20 years. Sarkozy has been criticized for accepting vacations from Bolloré, as was president Georges Pompidou with his father, Michel Bolloré. They have both stated that no conflict of interest exists.

Media engagement 
Bolloré has been investing massively in media for several years. He is the main shareholder of the Vivendi media group, which holds 18 percent of Universal Music Group in addition to numerous TV stations and newspapers. In 2022 he has also bought the largest private radio station in France, Europe 1 in time for the 2022 French presidential election.

Controversies 
In April 2016, Vincent Bolloré  launched a defamation law suit against the newspaper Bastamag, which had described "catastrophic" human rights conditions on plantations in Liberia where "children under 14 " were working. 

In January 2021 Vincent Bolloré and two other Bolloré executives pleaded guilty at a Paris court for supplying €370,000 worth of communication services to Togan president Faure Gnassingbé during their presidential campaigns

References

External links
Bolloré website
Vivendi French website

1952 births
Living people
21st-century French newspaper publishers (people)
Commandeurs of the Légion d'honneur
French billionaires
French chief executives
Businesspeople from Paris
French people of Breton descent
Lycée Janson-de-Sailly alumni
People from Boulogne-Billancourt
University of Paris alumni